Orosi can refer to:

 Orosi district, in Cartago province, Costa Rica
 Orosí Volcano in Guanacaste province, Costa Rica
 Orosi, Iran
 Orosi, California in the USA